Roland Giraud is a French actor. He married actress Maaike Jansen in 1966.

Giraud began his theatrical training in the 1960s and joined Coluche's theatrical company in 1971. Around this time he worked also with the troupe, Le Splendid. His first cinematic role came in 1974 in Michel Audiard's Bons baisers...à lundi. He acquired greater recognition for Papy fait de la résistance, and again, for his appearance in Coline Serreau's Trois hommes et un couffin.

He lost his daughter Géraldine, an actress herself, murdered when she was just thirty-six, in Villeneuve-sur-Yonne.<ref>The Independent  -'France glued to saga of the fugitive'  27 October 2009</ref>

 Selected filmography 
 Heroes Are Not Wet Behind the Ears (1979)
 Clara et les Chics Types (1981)
 Signes extérieurs de richesse (1983)
 Trois hommes et un couffin (1985) Tranches de vie (1985)
 Sans peur et sans reproche (1988)
 Les secrets professionnels du Dr Apfelglück (1991)
 A Mere Mortal (Simple mortel) — 1991
 Beur sur la ville (2011)
 The Gilded Cage'' (2013)

References

External links
 

1942 births
Living people
French male stage actors
French male film actors
People from Rabat
20th-century French male actors
21st-century French male actors
French male television actors